Anton Mahnič, also spelled Antun Mahnić in Croatian orthography (14 September 1850 – 30 December 1920), was a Croatian-Slovenian prelate of the Catholic Church and a philosopher who established and led the Croatian Catholic Movement. Mahnič served as the bishop of Krk from 1897 to his death in 1920.

Biography
Mahnič was born in Kobdilj near Štanjel in the Austrian County of Gorizia and Gradisca (in today's Slovenia). He finished theological studies in Vienna and then worked as a priest and a teacher in Gorizia. During this period, he became actively involved in the Slovene political life, criticising the liberal Catholic current within the Slovene national movement.

In 1896, he became Bishop of Krk (Croatia). In his bishopric he initiated many religious societies and activities, and started Catholic publishing, including a magazine for Christian philosophy called Hrvatska straža. He founded Catholic student magazines and societies all over the Austro-Hungarian Monarchy. He wrote many articles and works in the theological, philosophical, esthetical and political area. Later Mahnić initiated a Pius society, with its weekly newspaper Jutro.  These groups of Catholic intellectuals, gathered around these papers, joined together in the Croatian Catholic movement) before the First World War. After the war, Mahnić was persecuted after the territory was annexed by Italy, and he went to Zagreb, where he died.

Mahnić's main goal was defending and promoting Catholic faith and its moral principles in Croatian public and social life, which were endangered by liberalization and secularization. Also important issue for him was spiritual and intellectual education of the youth.

See also
Janez Evangelist Krek
Ljubomir Maraković
Ivan Merz
Ivan Protulipac
Josip Srebrnič
Josip Stadler
Ivan Tavčar

Sources
Bozanić, Antun: Biskup Mahnić. Pastir i javni djelatnik u Hrvata, Zagreb – Krk, 1991
Krišto, Jure: Hrvatski katolički pokret (1903–1945), Zagreb, 2004, 
Krišto, Jure: Prešućena povijest. Katolička Crkva u Hrvatskoj politici 1850–1918, Zagreb, 1994, 
Sinjeri, Josip: "Biskup Antun Mahnić i Hrvatski katolički pokret", Riječki teološki časopis, Rijeka, 15 (2007), 2 (30), 551–587

Slovenian Roman Catholic bishops
20th-century Slovenian philosophers
Slovenian emigrants to Croatia
Conservatism in Slovenia
Catholic philosophers
Roman Catholic bishops in Croatia
Bishops of Krk
Roman Catholic activists
People from the Municipality of Komen
People from Gorizia
1850 births
1920 deaths
Slovenian Servants of God
21st-century Slovenian philosophers